Nicolas Plestan (born 2 June 1981) is a former French footballer who played as a defender.

Honours
Lille
UEFA Intertoto Cup: 2004

Schalke 04
 DFB-Pokal: 2010–11

References

External links
 

1981 births
Living people
French footballers
French expatriate footballers
Association football defenders
AS Monaco FC players
AC Ajaccio players
Lille OSC players
FC Schalke 04 players
Ligue 1 players
Bundesliga players
Expatriate footballers in Germany